Margaret JoBeth Williams  (born December 6, 1948) is an American actress. She rose to prominence appearing in such films as Stir Crazy (1980), Poltergeist (1982), The Big Chill (1983), The Day After (1983), Teachers (1984), and Poltergeist II: The Other Side (1986). A three-time Emmy Award nominee, she was nominated for Outstanding Lead Actress in a Miniseries or a Movie for her work in the TV movie Adam (1983) and the TV miniseries Baby M (1988). Her third nomination was for her guest role in the sitcom Frasier (1994). She also starred in the TV series The Client (1995–96) and had recurring roles in the TV series Dexter (2007) and Private Practice (2009–11).

Her directorial debut with the 1994 short film On Hope earned her an Academy Award nomination for Best Live Action Short Film. In 2009, she began serving as president  of the Screen Actors Guild Foundation; she is President Emeritus of the foundation.

Early life
Williams was born in Houston, Texas, and is the daughter of Frances Faye (née Adams), a dietitian, and Fredric Roger Williams, an opera singer and manager of a wire and cable company. Williams grew up in the South Park neighborhood of Houston, and attended Jones High School, from which she graduated in 1966.<ref name="Distinguished">"Distinguished HISD Alumni ," Houston Independent School District'. Retrieved on January 13, 2011.</ref>

Career

Early career
Williams's first television role was on the Boston-produced first-run syndicated children's television series Jabberwocky, which debuted in 1972. Her character was named JoBeth. She joined the Jabberwocky cast in season two, replacing the original hostess, Joanne Sopko. The series ran until 1978. She was a regular on two soap operas, playing Carrie Wheeler on Somerset and Brandy Shelloe on Guiding Light. Williams's feature-film debut came in 1979's Kramer vs. Kramer as a girlfriend of Dustin Hoffman's character, memorably quizzed by his son after being discovered walking nude to the bathroom.

Motion pictures
Williams is perhaps most recognized for her roles in Stir Crazy (1980), with Gene Wilder and Richard Pryor, The Dogs of War (1980) with Christopher Walken and Tom Berenger, and Poltergeist (1982), as suburban housewife Diane Freeling, a character she reprised in a sequel, Poltergeist II: The Other Side, 1986). A year later, she was part of the ensemble comedy-drama The Big Chill (1983). Her starring role in the film American Dreamer (1984), opposite Tom Conti, earned her the 1985 Best Actress Award from the Kansas City Film Critics Circle. High-profile co-starring roles in Teachers (1984) with Nick Nolte, Desert Bloom (1986) with Jon Voight, Memories of Me with Billy Crystal (1988), and Blake Edwards's Switch (1991) with Ellen Barkin followed.

She is also known for starring opposite Kris Kristofferson in Oscar-winning director Franklin J. Schaffner's final film, the Vietnam POW drama Welcome Home (1989). In 1992, she re-teamed with The Big Chill director Lawrence Kasdan to portray Bessie Earp in Wyatt Earp with Kevin Costner, and starred as Crazy Diane/Sane Diane, a schizophrenic shut-in,  in the dark independent comedy, Me Myself & I.

She also co-starred with Ed O'Neill in the John Hughes-written comedy Dutch (1991), and starred in Stop! Or My Mom Will Shoot (1992) as the police detective/love interest of Sylvester Stallone's character. In 1995, she was nominated for an Academy Award for her 1994 live-action short On Hope, starring Annette O'Toole; the film was Williams's directorial debut. In 1997, she played a domineering lesbian in the independent comedy Little City with Jon Bon Jovi, and an hysterical publishing editor in Just Write with Jeremy Piven. In 2005, she appeared in the Drew Barrymore-Jimmy Fallon baseball comedy Fever Pitch.

In October 2011, she appeared with Steve Martin, Owen Wilson, Rashida Jones, and Jack Black in the bird-watching comedy The Big Year for Twentieth Century Fox.

Television work
Williams has also gained critical acclaim for a number of performances in notable television movies, including the nuclear holocaust film The Day After (1983), Murder Ordained (1987), as Lois Burnham Wilson in My Name is Bill W. (1989), and the critically acclaimed Masterpiece Theatre presentation of The Ponder Heart (2003) for director Martha Coolidge.

She earned Emmy nominations for starring as real-life characters Revé Walsh (the wife of John Walsh) in the film Adam (1983) and Mary Beth Whitehead in Baby M (1988). In 1993, she anchored the improvised Showtime dramedy Chantilly Lace with Helen Slater and Martha Plimpton.

She also had an Emmy-nominated guest-starring role on Frasier and played Reggie Love in the 1995–1996 CBS series The Client (adapted from the 1994 film of the same title), which lasted only 21 episodes, but gained a wider audience when it was rebroadcast in reruns on the TNT Network.

Williams appeared on a 2006 episode of 24 as Christopher Henderson (Peter Weller)'s wife, Miriam, who literally takes a (nonfatal) bullet for her husband.

She appeared in one episode of the 1998 TV miniseries From the Earth to the Moon as Marge Slayton, the wife of Deke Slayton. The episode is part 11 of the series and titled "The Original Wives Club".

In 1999, Williams teamed with John Larroquette and Julie Benz for the CBS network situation comedy Payne. The show, which was the American television version of the hit British comedy Fawlty Towers, lasted just 10 episodes.

In 2007, she joined Dexter for a four-episode arc as the serial killer's future mother-in-law, whose daughter was also played by Benz. Also, she appeared in a memorable 2009 Criminal Minds listed as Special Guest Star in the episode "Empty Planet" as Professor Ursula Kent, who helps the BAU with a bomb threat in Seattle.

She has played the recurring role of Bizzy Forbes-Montgomery, mother of Kate Walsh's Addison, on ABC's Private Practice since 2009.

In 2014, she appeared in the CBS science-fiction drama Extant, as Leigh Kern (season one, episode seven).

Personal life
 
She is married to TV and film director John Pasquin, with whom she worked on Jungle 2 Jungle''; they have two sons: Will and Nick; and she has a step-daughter, Sarah, from Pasquin's previous marriage.

Filmography

Film

Television

References

External links

1948 births
Actresses from Houston
American film actresses
American television actresses
American television directors
Pembroke College in Brown University alumni
Brown University alumni
Living people
20th-century American actresses
21st-century American actresses
American soap opera actresses
American women television directors